Timothy Commandeur (born 21 June 1990) is an ARIA Award–winning Sydney-based drummer and producer, best known as the drummer in Operator Please and Panama.

Biography 
Drumming since the age of ten, Commandeur joined Amandah Wilkinson and the band Operator Please in 2005 at age 15. The band performed together for six years. and toured the world and performed on major stages such as Glastonbury to Splendour In The Grass winning an ARIA Award at the ARIA Music Awards of 2007.

In 2011, Commandeur joined cousin and former Operator Please member Chris Holland to form the band Colour Coding. They released an EP called Proof and the duo created remixes for artists Amy Meredith and Alpine.

In 2013, Commandeur made his first foray into a solo career, releasing an EP called Cabin Fever as Alaskan Knight.

In 2014, Commandeur joined the band Panama and embarked on tours around the world including playing at SXSW in 2014 and Primavera Festival in 2015.

Since 2015, Commandeur writes  music under the moniker "Commandeur" and signed with Risqué Music in 2020. Commandeur's work has attracted feature vocals from KLP, Ollie Gabriel, Genes and Yeo along with the likes of Set Mo requesting a remix.

When discussing Commandeur's collaboration with Ollie Gabriel on the song "Me and You", Dave Ruby Howe from Triple J stated "Tim's a skilled drummer and equally talented producer". 

Commandeur has drummed as part of the stage band for PNAU, Alice Ivy and Tkay Maidza and international acts that tour Australia such as Dua Lipa and King Princess.

Personal life 

Commandeur dated model and actress April Rose Pengilly, daughter of INXS musician Kirk Pengilly, from 2011 to 2014. Commandeur has been dating Laura Lee Scott since 2014 and were due to be married in October 2020 but had to postpone due to the pandemic. They eventually married in 2022 at Sydney’s Strickland House and it was featured in Vogue Australia.

Operator Please recorded their first EP in Commandeur's father Roulf's professional recording studio on the Gold Coast. When Roulf died in 2016, Commandeur inherited his father's recording gear, including Genelec speakers.

Commandeur's first drum kit was a 1960s Premier Jazz kit that his father bought from the local Avon lady for $400 after her husband died.

In 2017, a fire broke out in a studio in Marrickville, which saw Commandeur losing recording equipment to fire damage.

Discography

Extended Plays

See also
 Colour Coding
 Operator Please
 Panama

References 

Australian drummers
1990 births
Child musicians
Living people